Issah Abdoulaye Salou (born 4 February 1999) is a Nigerien professional footballer who plays as a central midfielder for Danish 2nd Division club Skive IK.

Career
Salou joined the youth academy of Ghanaian side Sporting Club Accra.

In 2019, he signed for Randers in the Danish Superliga. During February 2021 he signed a deal for the rest of the season with Danish 2nd Division club Jammerbugt FC.

On 1 February 2022, Salou signed with Danish 2nd Division club Skive IK.

References

External links
 
 

1999 births
Living people
Nigerien footballers
Association football midfielders
Niger international footballers
Niger youth international footballers
Danish Superliga players
Danish 2nd Division players
Randers FC players
Jammerbugt FC players
Skive IK players
Nigerien expatriate footballers
Expatriate footballers in Ghana
Nigerien expatriate sportspeople in Ghana
Expatriate men's footballers in Denmark
Nigerien expatriate sportspeople in Denmark